Saint Martin and the Beggar is a painting by the Greek mannerist painter El Greco, painted c. 1597–1599, that currently is in the collection of The National Gallery of Art, Washington, DC. It depicts a legend in the life of Christian saint Martin of Tours: the saint cut off half his cloak and gave it to a beggar.

El Greco made a smaller version of the painting that is in the collection of the Art Institute of Chicago.

References

Paintings by El Greco
1590s paintings
Collections of the National Gallery of Art
Paintings in the collection of the Art Institute of Chicago
Horses in art